Rakin (also Romanized as Rakīn and Rokīn; also known as Raikhin) is a village in Khenejin Rural District, in the Central District of Komijan County, Markazi Province, Iran. At the 2006 census, its population was 449, in 104 families.

References 

Populated places in Komijan County